Cofton railway station was a station in Cofton Hackett, Worcestershire, England. The station was opened as the temporary northern terminus during the construction of the Birmingham and Gloucester Railway, later reopening as a through station for two years.
See also entry for Croft Farm railway station.

References

Disused railway stations in Worcestershire
Railway stations in Great Britain opened in 1840
Railway stations in Great Britain closed in 1840
Railway stations in Great Britain opened in 1841
Railway stations in Great Britain closed in 1843